Neriene peltata is a species of spider belonging to the family Linyphiidae. It has a Holarctic distribution.

Like other members of this family, this is a small spider: the body length excluding legs is about 5 mm. The carapace is brown with a black central stripe. The abdomen is striped brown and white. It builds a hammock-shaped web among bushes which it rests beneath.

References

Linyphiidae
Spiders described in 1834
Holarctic spiders